The 1st constituency of the Haut-Rhin is a French legislative constituency in the Haut-Rhin département.

Description

The seat includes the town of Colmar and then stretches eastwards towards the Rhine which forms the border with Germany. The seat has followed the historic pattern of Alsace by supporting parties of the right over the PS and its allies.

Historic Representation

Election results

2022

 
 
|-
| colspan="8" bgcolor="#E9E9E9"|
|-

2020 by-election
The deputy, Éric Straumann, was appointed Mayor of Colmar in 2020.  This triggered the accumulation of mandates rule, so he  left the National Assembly.  His substitute candidate, Brigitte Klinkert, was Minister Delegate for Economic Inclusion, so a by-election was called.

 
 
 
 
 
 
 
|-
| colspan="8" bgcolor="#E9E9E9"|
|-

2017

 
 
 
 
 
 
 
|-
| colspan="8" bgcolor="#E9E9E9"|
|-

2012

 
 
 
 
 
 
|-
| colspan="8" bgcolor="#E9E9E9"|
|-

2007

2002

|- style="background-color:#E9E9E9;text-align:center;"
! colspan="2" rowspan="2" style="text-align:left;" | Candidate
! rowspan="2" colspan="2" style="text-align:left;" | Party
! colspan="2" | 1st round
|- style="background-color:#E9E9E9;text-align:center;"
! width="75" | Votes
! width="30" | %
|-
| style="background-color:" |
| style="text-align:left;" | Gilbert Meyer
| style="text-align:left;" | Union for a Presidential Majority
| UMP
| 
| 52.13
|-
| style="background-color:" |
| style="text-align:left;" | Monique Marchal
| style="text-align:left;" | Socialist Party
| PS
| 
| 20.86
|-
| style="background-color:" |
| style="text-align:left;" | Bruno Haebig
| style="text-align:left;" | National Front
| FN
| 
| 12.53
|-
| style="background-color:" |
| style="text-align:left;" | Frederic Hilbert
| style="text-align:left;" | The Greens
| LV
| 
| 3.47
|-
| style="background-color:" |
| style="text-align:left;" | Rene Becker
| style="text-align:left;" | National Republican Movement
| MNR
| 
| 2.81
|-
| style="background-color:" |
| style="text-align:left;" | Brigitte Courteville
| style="text-align:left;" | Independent
| DIV
| 
| 1.49
|-
| style="background-color:" |
| style="text-align:left;" | Gerard Probst
| style="text-align:left;" | Ecologist
| ECO
| 
| 1.40
|-
| style="background-color:" |
| style="text-align:left;" | Christian Rousset
| style="text-align:left;" | Workers’ Struggle
| LO
| 
| 1.36
|-
| style="background-color:" |
| style="text-align:left;" | Lydia Lacentra
| style="text-align:left;" | Movement for France
| MPF
| 
| 1.33
|-
| style="background-color:" |
| style="text-align:left;" | Mathieu Lavarenne
| style="text-align:left;" | Republican Pole
| PR
| 
| 1.26
|-
| style="background-color:" |
| style="text-align:left;" | Eliane Lodwitz
| style="text-align:left;" | Communist Party
| PCF
| 
| 0.85
|-
| style="background-color:" |
| style="text-align:left;" | Vincent Wischlen
| style="text-align:left;" | Miscellaneous Right
| DVD
| 
| 0.51
|-
| colspan="6" style="background-color:#E9E9E9;"|
|- style="font-weight:bold"
| colspan="4" style="text-align:left;" | Total
| 
| 100%
|-
| colspan="6" style="background-color:#E9E9E9;"|
|-
| colspan="4" style="text-align:left;" | Registered voters
| 
| style="background-color:#E9E9E9;"|
|-
| colspan="4" style="text-align:left;" | Blank/Void ballots
| 
| 2.45%
|-
| colspan="4" style="text-align:left;" | Turnout
| 
| 60.26%
|-
| colspan="4" style="text-align:left;" | Abstentions
| 
| 39.74%
|-
| colspan="6" style="background-color:#E9E9E9;"|
|- style="font-weight:bold"
| colspan="4" style="text-align:left;" | Result
| colspan="2" style="background-color:" | UMP GAIN FROM RPR
|}

Sources

1